Koryta  is a village in the administrative district of Gmina Raszków, within Ostrów Wielkopolski County, Greater Poland Voivodeship, in west-central Poland.

The village has an approximate population of 1,000.

References

Koryta